Maly Trostenets (Maly Trascianiec, "Little Trostenets") is a village near Minsk in Belarus, formerly the Byelorussian Soviet Socialist Republic. During Nazi Germany's occupation of the area during World War II (when the Germans referred to it as Reichskommissariat Ostland), the village became the location of a Nazi extermination site.

Throughout 1942, Jews from Austria, Germany, the Netherlands, Poland, and the Protectorate of Bohemia and Moravia were taken by train to Maly Trostinets to be lined up in front of the pits and were shot. From the summer of 1942, mobile gas vans were also used. According to Yad Vashem, the Jews of Minsk were murdered and buried in Maly Trostinets and in another village, Bolshoi Trostinets, between 28 and 31 July 1942 and on 21 October 1943. As the Red Army approached the area in June 1944, the Germans murdered most of the prisoners and destroyed the camp.

The estimates of how many people were murdered at Maly Trostinets vary. According to Yad Vashem, 65,000 Jews were murdered in one of the nearby pine forests, mostly by shooting. Holocaust historian Stephan Lehnstaedt believes the number is higher, writing that at least 106,000 Jews were murdered at the location. Researchers from the Soviet Union estimated there had been around 200,000 murders at the camp and nearby execution sites. Lehnstaedt writes that the estimates include the Jews of the Minsk Ghetto, who numbered 39,000 to almost 100,000.

Camp establishment and destruction 

Built in the summer of 1941 on the site of a Soviet kolkhoz, a collective farm  in size, Trostinets was set up by Nazi Germany as a concentration camp with no fixed killing facilities. It was originally established for Soviet prisoners of war captured during the invasion of the Soviet Union, which began on 22 June 1941.

Jews from Austria, Germany and the Czech Republic were murdered there. Holocaust transports organized by the SS were sent from Berlin, Hanover, Dortmund, Münster, Düsseldorf, Cologne, Frankfurt am Main, Kassel, Stuttgart, Nuremberg, Munich, Breslau, Königsberg, Vienna, Prague, Brünn, and Theresienstadt. In most cases, the Jews were murdered on arrival. They were trucked from the train stop to the Blagovshchina (Благовщина) and Shashkovka (Шашковка) forests and shot in the back of the neck.

The primary purpose of the camp was the murder of Jewish prisoners of the Minsk Ghetto and the surrounding area. Firing squad was the chief execution method. Mobile gas vans were also deployed. Baltic German SS-Scharführer Heinrich Eiche was the camp administrator. As the Red Army approached the camp in June 1944, toward the end of World War II, between June 28 and June 30, the Germans murdered the majority of prisoners by locking them inside of the camps, burning their barracks, and when anyone tried to escape the burning building they were shot. By June 30 the entire camp had been destroyed, however, a few Jewish prisoners were able to escape into the surrounding Blagovshchina forest and survive until July 3 when the approaching Red Army reached the decimated camp.

A great number of Soviet soldiers, citizens and partisans were murdered, but the exact number remains unknown. Estimates range from 80,000 to more than 330,000.

After the war

Perpetrators 
Few of the perpetrators were brought to justice. Among them was Eduard Strauch, who died in a Belgian prison in 1955. In 1968 a court in Hamburg sentenced three low-ranking SS men to life imprisonment: Rottenführer Otto Erich Drews, Revieroberleutnant Otto Hugo Goldapp, and Hauptsturmführer Max Hermann Richard Krahner. The men were German overseers of the Jewish Sonderkommando 1005; they were found guilty of murdering laborers forced to cover up the traces of the crimes in 1943.

Victims 
The names of 10,000 Austrian Jews murdered in Maly Trostinec were collected in a book, Maly Trostinec – Das Totenbuch: Den Toten ihre Namen, by Waltraud Barton.
 
Cora Berliner (most likely)
Grete Forst
Mitzi Freud and Paula Winternitz née Freud
Arthur Ernst Rutra, author and translator
Vincent Hadleŭski [Wincenty Godlewski], Roman Catholic priest and Belarusian nationalist resistance fighter ( 1888), arrested in Minsk on 24 December 1942 and shot at Trostinets the same day.
Margarete Hilferding (in transit to the camp from Terezín)
Norbert Jokl (debated)

Memorial
A memorial built at the site of the camp attracts thousands of visitors annually, especially after travel restrictions eased with the dissolution of the Soviet Union.

See also 
 List of Nazi concentration camps
 Nazi concentration camps

Notes

References

Further reading 

 Kohl, Paul (1995). Der Krieg der deutschen Wehrmacht und der Polizei, 1941–1944: sowjetische Überlebende berichten. Frankfurt am Main: Fischer-Taschenbuch-Verlag (includes a photograph of the camp).
 

 

 
Nazi concentration camps in Belarus
World War II sites in Belarus
World War II sites of Nazi Germany

Geography of Minsk
History of Minsk